Nephoploca hoenei is a moth in the family Drepanidae and the only species in the genus Nephoploca. It was described by Sick in 1941. It is found in the Chinese provinces of Shaanxi, Gansu and Sichuan.

References

Moths described in 1941
Thyatirinae
Monotypic moth genera
Moths of Asia
Drepanidae genera